Justice League: Cosmic Chaos is an action-adventure game based on the DC Comics superhero team of the same name. Developed by PHL Collective and released by Outright Games in association with Warner Bros. Games, the game revolves around Superman, Batman, and Wonder Woman to stop the machinations of Mr. Mxyzptlk from turning the town of Happy Harbor into his own personal Metropolis.

The game was released on March 10, 2023, for Nintendo Switch, PlayStation 4, PlayStation 5, Windows, Xbox One, and Xbox Series X/S.

Plot
Lucas "Snapper" Carr is elected the Mayor of his hometown of Happy Harbor, Rhode Island, where his inauguration ceremony gets interrupted when Mr. Mxyzptlk unleashes his magic to summon Starro as he declares himself Mayor instead of Carr. Leaving the Justice League to stop Mr. Mxyzptlk's machinations before it is too late.

Development
The game was announced on May 23, 2022, with a teaser trailer featuring the Justice League members, Superman, Batman, Wonder Woman, The Flash, Aquaman, Green Lantern and Cyborg. Details for the game were revealed in December of that year, including a new trailer that featured the proper title and the reveal of the game's main antagonist Mr. Mxyzptlk, with the character voiced by Dana Snyder. The game is dedicated to artists Neal Adams, Alan Grant, George Pérez, Tim Sale, prominent Batman voice actor Kevin Conroy, and comedian Gilbert Gottfried, who all passed away in 2022. Gottfried originally was going to reprise the role from Superman: The Animated Series, Justice League Action and the video games, Lego Batman 3: Beyond Gotham and Lego DC Super-Villains prior to Snyder's casting.

Voice acting
A month before the game's release, a hands-on sneak preview revealed Nolan North, Diedrich Bader, and Vanessa Marshall reprising their roles as Superman, Batman, and Wonder Woman from previous DC properties. More additional cast members were revealed on February 20, 2022, consisting of Josh Keaton and Cooper Andrews reprising their roles as Flash and Aquaman from the 2015 DC Super Hero Girls series and the Aquaman: King of Atlantis mini-series, Delbert Hunt as Cyborg and TC Carson as Green Lantern.

Reception

References

External Links
Official website

Action-adventure games
Alien invasions in video games
Multiplayer and single-player video games
Nintendo Switch games
Open-world video games
PlayStation 4 games
PlayStation 5 games
Science fiction video games
Superhero video games
Video games based on DC Comics
Video games based on Justice League
Video games developed in the United States
Video games featuring female protagonists
Video games set in the United States
Windows games
Xbox One games
Xbox Series X and Series S games
Outright Games games